Matti Mounir Lamberg (born January 6, 1993) is a Finnish ice hockey player. He is currently playing for HIFK in the Finnish SM-liiga.

Lamberg made his SM-liiga debut playing with Jokerit during the 2012–13 SM-liiga season.

Personal life
Lamberg is of Moroccan-Berber descent through his father.

References

External links

1993 births
Living people
Finnish ice hockey right wingers
Finnish people of Moroccan-Berber descent
Ässät players
Espoo United players
HIFK (ice hockey) players
Jokerit players
Kiekko-Laser players
People from Kiiminki
Sportspeople from North Ostrobothnia
Vaasan Sport players